Hypancistrus is a genus of loricariid catfish originating from the Amazon basin in South America. Unlike many of the other Loricariids, however, some Hypancistrus species are more carnivorous and enjoy meat in their diet. Hypancistrus species are popular aquarium fish, including such popular fish as the zebra pleco and Queen Arabesque pleco.

Etymology
The name Hypancistrus is derived from the Greek "hypo" meaning under and "agkistron" meaning hook.

Taxonomy
This genus is a relatively recent one, described in 1991 with its type species H. zebra. H. inspector was the next species to be described in 2002. In 2007, four new species of Hypancistrus were described. However, there are still many more undescribed species. These undescribed species are often designated with L-numbers. It was believed that this genus isn't monophyletic, though this has since changed.

Species
There are currently 8 recognized species in this genus:
 Hypancistrus contradens Armbruster, Lujan & Taphorn, 2007
 Hypancistrus debilittera Armbruster, Lujan & Taphorn, 2007
 Hypancistrus furunculus Armbruster, Lujan & Taphorn, 2007
 Hypancistrus inspector Armbruster, 2002
 Hypancistrus lunaorum Armbruster, Lujan & Taphorn, 2007
 Hypancistrus margaritatus M. Tan & Armbruster, 2016 
 Hypancistrus phantasma M. Tan & Armbruster, 2016 
 Hypancistrus zebra Isbrücker & Nijssen, 1991 (Zebra pleco)

Distribution and habitat
H. zebra originates from the Xingu River. Hypancistrus are also known from the Orinoco River and the Rio Negro. The rest of the described species originate from Venezuela; the four new species alone originate from the northern Orinoco in southern Venezuela, near or in the Ventuari River. New species await to be described from regions such as Brazil and Guyana.

These fish are found in slow to moderately flowing water. They like to inhabit the bedrock and crevices within bedrock.

Anatomy and appearance
Hypancistrus, like other Loricariids, are armored catfish with a suckermouth. This suckermouth allows the fish to attach to objects. Their body is armored by scutes rather than covered in scales. These fish have strong pectoral and dorsal fin spines. The eye is specially developed with an omega iris. The body is flat on the ventral surface and naked (scaleless).

Hypancistrus species can be differentiated from other genera of Loricariids by a number of characteristics. These fish have highly angled jaws that form an angle of less than 90 degrees, which is a trait shared only by a few other genera. Also, their scutes are not highly ridged or keeled like that of some genera, and their abdomen is only half-plated with this armor as opposed to full-plated. Hypancistrus have fewer dentary teeth than premaxillary teeth, and the former are almost twice as long as the latter. Fish of this genus tend to be attractively marked with dark brown to black and white, arranged in spots, stripes, or squiggles. Breeding males have larger odontodes on the pectoral fin spines and on the cheek, though in some species, breeding males also have hypertrophied odontodes on the lateral plates like Peckoltia. Synapomorphies of this genus include differences in the jaw structure from other Loricariids. These fish do not get very large; no species exceeds about 11 centimetres (4 in).

The different species of Hypancistrus are distinguishable by differences in their stripe, band, or spot patterns. H. zebra is distinguishable as a white fish with oblique, black stripes that extend from behind the head into the tail, with an obvious E turned sidesways on its nose. H. furunculus appears rather similar to H. zebra, but it has a creamier color (rather than white) and it only has one oblique stripe rather than many. H. furunculus and H. debilittera both have vertical stripes on the caudal fin. However, H. debilittera has a dark base color and white spots, bands, and vermiculations with an either weakly formed or absent E on the nose. In H. inspector, there are smaller spots on the head and larger spots on the body, and some of the spots on the upper caudal fin will join and form bands. If the dorsal fin of H. inspector is pushed down, the dorsal fin does not reach the adipose fin, in contrast to both H. contradens and H. lunaorum. H. lunaorum has very small, gold spots dotting its body and, if present, the spots on the head will be of the same size. H. contradens has white or pink, similarly sized spots large that do not connect to form bands. H. margaritatus is distinguished from all congeners by its color pattern of dense, small, light-colored spots on a dark base color and H. phantasma can be distinguished from congeners by a color pattern consisting of a tan base coloration with black spots.

Diet
Hypancistrus are unusual in that some species accept meatier foods than many of their relatives, and are generally omnivorous; H. zebra is often cited as a fish that likes to accept meatier foods. Some other members of the genus tend to eat more plant material; H. inspector has been studied to eat algae, detritus, and also seeds. H. contradens is noted to probably feed on aufwuchs; their guts have been shown to contain filamentous algae as well as various organic and inorganic matter.

In the aquarium
Many Hypancistrus are popular aquarium fish due to their small size and attractive coloration. Because of their more carnivorous diet, these fish are not like the algae eaters aquarists are used to. These fish should be provided with clean, fast-moving water. They can be maintained in community aquariums, but quieter cohabitants are preferred so that these fish are not scared into hiding. Members of this genus have been captive bred by hobbyists.

Below is a list of the described Hypancistrus with their L-numbers, as well as some undescribed types with common names that appear in the aquarium trade. There are many Hypancistrus only designated by their L-number that are not included. H. phantasma is not designated by L-numbers because this species is only known from holotype and paratypes caught on 14 February 1924 from Taracuá, Río Uaupés a tributary of the Río Negro drainage.

References

Ancistrini
Fish of the Amazon basin
Fish of South America
Catfish genera
Taxa named by Isaäc J. H. Isbrücker
Taxa named by Han Nijssen
Freshwater fish genera